is a passenger railway station in the town of Yorii, Saitama, Japan, operated by the private railway operator Chichibu Railway.

Lines

Station layout
The station is staffed and consists of a single island platform serving two tracks, with an additional bidirectional track adjacent to track 2 for use by freight services.

Platforms

Adjacent stations

History
Hagure Station opened on 1 April 1903.

Passenger statistics
In fiscal 2018, the station was used by an average of 227 passengers daily.

Surrounding area
 Arakawa River
 Tamayodo Dam

See also
 List of railway stations in Japan

References

External links

 Hagure Station information (Saitama Prefectural Government) 
 Hagure Station timetable 

Railway stations in Japan opened in 1903
Railway stations in Saitama Prefecture
Yorii, Saitama